The Pact of Social Integration is a local, right-wing political party in Sucre and several other municipalities of Chuquisaca department, Bolivia.  Party members Aydeé Nava and Jaime Barrón Poveda are former mayors of the city. Currently, the party effectively has five members of the 11-member Sucre council:

Political parties in Bolivia